Joseph Lewis Jr. (1772March 30, 1834) was an 18th-century and 19th-century politician and lawyer from Virginia.

Biography
Born in the Colony of Virginia, Lewis served in the Virginia House of Delegates from 1799 to 1803. He was then elected a Federalist to the United States House of Representatives in 1802, serving from 1803 to 1817. There, he served as chairman of the Committee on the District of Columbia from 1807 to 1809 and again from 1811 to 1813. Lewis returned to the House of Delegates in 1817 and 1818. He died at Clifton Farm in Upperville, Virginia, on March 30, 1834.

Electoral history

1805; Lewis was elected to the U.S. House of Representatives with 55.95% of the vote, defeating Democratic-Republican William Elzey.
1807; Lewis was re-elected with 55.19% of the vote, defeating Democratic-Republican John Littlejohn.
1809; Lewis was re-elected with 62.04% of the vote, defeating Democratic-Republican William Tyler.
1811; Lewis was re-elected with 80.09% of the vote, defeating Democratic-Republican John Love.

External links

1772 births
1834 deaths
Members of the Virginia House of Delegates
Virginia lawyers
Federalist Party members of the United States House of Representatives from Virginia
19th-century American lawyers